Goose Hollow/Southwest Jefferson Street is a light rail station on the MAX Blue and Red Lines in the Goose Hollow neighborhood of Portland, Oregon. It is the third stop westbound on the Westside MAX alignment and makes several cameo appearances in the movie What the Bleep Do We Know!? as the stop where Marlee Matlin's character boards the train to get into town.

Location
Goose Hollow/SW Jefferson Street station is located in the Goose Hollow neighborhood of western Portland. Specifically, it is located on the southern side of SW Jefferson Street, across from the Goose Hollow Inn owned by Bud Clark, former mayor of Portland. To the east of the station, the tracks curve through Collins Circle, a roundabout at the junction of SW Jefferson and SW 18th Streets. Trains turn north onto 18th as they move eastbound; to the west, the tracks pass under the Vista Avenue viaduct (more commonly referred to as the Vista Bridge) and into the Robertson Tunnel under Portland's West Hills.

Station layout
The station uses a simple side platform layout with two tracks running between them.  Access to the platforms is via the street with ramps on either end of each platform. There is also a crossing for pedestrians to change platforms.

Bus connections
This station at Collins Circle is served by the following bus lines:
6 – Martin Luther King Jr Blvd
58 – Canyon Rd
68 – Marquam Hill/Collins Circle

References

External links
Station information (with eastbound ID number) from TriMet
Station information (with westbound ID number) from TriMet
MAX Light Rail Stations – more general TriMet page

1998 establishments in Oregon
Goose Hollow, Portland, Oregon
MAX Blue Line
MAX Red Line
MAX Light Rail stations
Railway stations in the United States opened in 1998
Railway stations in Portland, Oregon